The Oshawa Civic Band is a traditional Canadian "British" brass band  based in the city of Oshawa, Ontario.  It is similar to the bands of The Salvation Army, which means that all parts, except for the bass trombone and percussion, are in treble clef, and the instrumentation is made up of Eb Soprano Cornet, Solo, 1st/Repiano, 2nd and 3rd Bb Cornets, Bb Flugal Horn, Solo, 1st and 2nd Eb Tenor Horns, 1st and 2nd Baritones, Euphonium, 1st and 2nd (Tenor) Trombones, Bass Trombone, EEb and BBb bass and percussion.

History

Military service

The band began life in 1870 as the band of the 34th Ontario Regiment, and was a traditional Military band. In 1920, the regimental band merged with the Oshawa Citizens' Band, to become the Oshawa Civic and Regimental Band. As time passed the band evolved into its current configuration.  In 1942, a bandshell and a bandroom were built in Oshawa's Memorial Park for use by the group, with the sponsorship of industrialist Robert McLaughlin.

Civilian service
Official ties with the regiment were ended in 1968 due to budget cuts by the federal government as a result of the Unification of the Canadian Armed Forces. After this, Naval Lieutenant Bill Askew intervened in the destruction of the band's history, resulting in it officially assuming the name of Oshawa Civic band and has since become incorporated. Many of the former regimental bandsmen continue to play with the Civic Band today. The band performs regular outdoor concerts in Oshawa during the summer months, as well as at special events and ceremonies. The band has often performed in concert with other musical groups, including the Festival Singers and the County Town Singers. In 2016, the band recorded a CD.

Further reading

References

External links 
 Band's own web site

1870 establishments in Ontario
Musical groups established in 1870
Brass bands
Musical groups from Oshawa
Canadian marching bands
Military bands of Canada